Gavialis pachyrhynchus is an extinct species of gavialid from the Miocene of India.  Although only known from fragmentary jaw material, the size of this material is substantially larger than comparable bones in large gharials.

A 2018 re-evaluation of the genus Gavialis suggests that G. pachyrhynchus be instead moved under the genus Rhamphosuchus.

References

Gavialidae
Miocene crocodylomorphs
Fossil taxa described in 1944